Michael Johnston (born October 15, 1976) is an American drummer. He currently runs the educational website Mikeslessons.com, where he offers live and pre-recorded drum lessons.

Early life
Mike Johnston began studying the drums at the age of five. He spent the next fifteen years studying privately with drummers Pete Magadini, Steve Ferrone, and Will Kennedy.

At the age of 21 he received his first major label record deal with his band Simon Says and spent the next five years touring the world. He received a gold record for his contributions to the Varsity Blues soundtrack and has appeared on the Late Show with David Letterman as well as on MTV's Fashionably Loud. Johnston has also toured with Warner Brothers Recording artists Filter.

In 2016, he won the Modern Drummer Readers Poll award for Clinician/Educator of the Year.

References

1976 births
Living people
Musicians from Santa Monica, California
20th-century American drummers
American male drummers
Hollywood Records artists
21st-century American drummers